Charles J. Lister (1820, in London – 1912, in Owen Sound, Ontario) was a central figure in the Restoration Movement in 19th century Canada. 

He immigrated to Bowmanville U.C. in 1821, In the late 1840s he turned down a handsome position with the Bank of Montreal for a life of service in the ministry with the Disciples of Christ. The Disciples can be traced to the evangelical influences of the 19th century brothers James and Robert Haldane, Greville Ewing, and 18th century John Glas and Robert Sandeman, all of Scotland. 'C. J.' was known as the "Ubiquitous Lister" owing to his widespread and lengthy evangelical work in Ontario and Manitoba. 

In 1855 Lister accompanied Alexander Campbell, the Irish born cofounder of the American Disciples of Christ on his sole visit to Upper Canada. Campbell himself had been favorably impressed in 1808/09 with Greville Ewing in Glasgow. In the 1860s Lister edited his own journal The Advisor.  A son, John B. Lister continued in missionary work in Oregon and was editor there of the Church and School Reporter.

Sources
 Reuben Butchart, The Disciples of Christ in Canada Since 1830, Canadian Headquarters' Publications, Churches of Christ (Disciples), Toronto, 1949. Entry on Charles J. Lister. pp. 141–142.

Restoration Movement
1820 births
1912 deaths
Canadian religious leaders